Dallas High School may refer to:

 Dallas High School (Dallas, Pennsylvania)
 Dallas High School (Oregon)
 Dallas High School (Texas)
 North Dallas High School in Dallas, Texas